Elkwater is an unincorporated community in Randolph County, West Virginia, United States.

The community takes its name from nearby Elkwater Fork creek.

History
A Union artillery fortification known as Camp Elkwater was built at Elkwater Fork in the summer of 1861 in what was then western Virginia. 3,000 Federal troops under General Joseph J. Reynolds were sent in September 1861 to repel the forces of General Robert E Lee in the wake of the Battle of Cheat Mountain.

References

Unincorporated communities in Randolph County, West Virginia
Unincorporated communities in West Virginia
1861 in the American Civil War